The women's shot put event  at the 1989 IAAF World Indoor Championships was held at the Budapest Sportcsarnok in Budapest on 5 March.

Results

References

Shot put
Shot put at the World Athletics Indoor Championships